Lemminkäinen can refer to any of the following

Lemminkäinen, a mythical hero of the Kalevala.
Lemminkäinen Suite, a composition by Jean Sibelius based on the hero.
Lemminkäinen Group, a Finnish construction company
Klaipėdos Lemminkainen, women basketball club in Lithuania